The Order of the White Star was instituted in 1936. The Order of the White Star is bestowed on Estonian citizens and foreigners to give recognition for services rendered to the Estonian state.

Design

Classes 
The Order of the White Star comprises one special collar class, five basic classes, and one medal:

 Special class: Collar of the Order. It is a golden necklet that has smaller Stars in its design all around it.
 The five main classes:
 First Class – It has two different types, the male version and the female version. The male version of the Order of the White Star has wider ribbons than the female class.
 Second Class – It has two different types, the male version and the female version. The male version of the Order of the White Star is worn around the neck, female recipients wear the insignia mounted on a bow on the left chest.
 Third Class – It has two different types, the male version and the female version. The male version of the Order of the White Star has a full neck ribbon, while a "bow and tails" ribbon is worn in the female version. The Third Class doesn't come with the Star of the Order, just the ribbon and the attached Order Badge.
 Fourth Class – It has just one type but the single ribbon has a rosette on it.
 Fifth Class – It has just one type but the single ribbon does not have a rosette on it.
 The Order has a single Medal Class. The medal class has the same design as the fifth main class, but the badge itself is backed in a circular section of silver.

Ribbons 
The ribbon is red coloured, and is attached to all classes, and the medal of the Order of the White Star.
The First, Second, and Third classes have a double ribbon design, the First has a crossed design, the Second and Third classes have the ribbons meeting at the ends to attach to the Order's Star. The Fourth, Fifth, and the Medal classes have a single red ribbon design.

See also
 :Category:Recipients of the Order of the White Star

References

External links 

 The Order of the White Star, president.ee
 Teenetemärkide seadus, Elektrooniline Riigiteataja 
 An example of a donation diploma
 List of bearers of the Order of the White Star

Orders, decorations, and medals of Estonia
White Star, Order of the
Awards established in 1936
1936 establishments in Estonia